An assegai is a type of spear.

Assegai may also refer to:

 Assegai (automobile), a South African-built Formula One car
 Assegai (novel), a 2009 novel by Wilbur Smith
 Assegai tree (Curtisia dentata), a tree indigenous to South Africa
 The Assegai, a 1982 Zimbabwean film
 An alternative spelling of the South African town Assagay

See also
 Assagai, a British Afro-rock band
 Assagai (horse) (1963–1986), an American Thoroughbred racehorse
 Assegaj, a monotypic genus of moths in the family Cossidae